Clarence Addison Brimmer Jr. (July 11, 1922 – October 23, 2014) was an American judge. He served as a United States district judge of the United States District Court for the District of Wyoming.

Life and career
Born in Rawlins, Wyoming, Brimmer was the son of Geraldine Zingsheim and Clarence Addison Brimmer Sr. He attended Rawlins High School and the University of Michigan, where he had served as a editor for The Michigan Daily. He also attended the University of Michigan Law School, where he earned his Juris Doctor degree.

Brimmer served in the United States Army Air Corps during World War II. 

He served as a chairperson of the Wyoming Republican Party from 1967 to 1971. After stepping down as chairperson, Brimmer was nominated by the 27th Governor of Wyoming, Stanley K. Hathaway, to serve as the attorney general for Wyoming. He succeeded James E. Barrett and served until 1974, when he was succeeded by David B. Kennedy. He then was nominated by Gerald Ford to serve as the United States Attorney for the United States District Court for the District of Wyoming until 1975.

Brimmer served as a judge of the United States District Court for the District of Wyoming, succeeding Ewing Thomas Kerr. He was succeeded by Nancy D. Freudenthal in 2006. Brimmer served as the senior judge for the district.

Brimmer died in October 2014 at the Boulder Community Hospital in Boulder, Colorado, at the age of 92.

References

External links 
 
  Judges of the United States

Judges of the United States District Court for the District of Wyoming
United States district court judges appointed by Gerald Ford
20th-century American judges
United States Attorneys for the District of Wyoming
United States Army Air Forces personnel of World War II
University of Michigan Law School alumni
Wyoming Attorneys General
Wyoming lawyers
Wyoming Republicans
People from Rawlins, Wyoming
Politicians from Cheyenne, Wyoming
The Michigan Daily alumni
United States Army Air Forces soldiers